Floating city may refer to:

Settlements
 Aberdeen floating village, Hong Kong
 Floating cities and islands in fiction, the use of artificial floating cities as a speculative fiction trope
 Freedom Ship, a proposed floating city project (1990s)
 Ocean colonization, the theory and practice of building structures to allow humans to live permanently in areas of Earth covered in water
 Seasteading, the concept of creating permanent dwellings at sea
 Very large floating structure, the theory and practice of building floating structures on the sea

Entertainment
 "Floating City" (song), by Tori Amos' 1980s synthpop band
 Floating Cities, a 1991 book by Stephen Wiltshire
 Floating City, a 2012 film from Hong Kong
 Stargate: Atlantis (TV Series 2004–2009)

See also
 Floating island
 
 Stilt house
 Mobile offshore base (MOB)
 Walking city
 Fata morgana (mirage)